Claim jumper may refer to:

A dishonest miner who violates another's land claim
Claim Jumper, a restaurant chain
Claim Jumper (NASCAR), a driver who participates in multiple series
Claim Jumper (video game), a 1982 video game